Lepidospartum squamatum is a species of flowering shrub in the daisy family known by the common names California broomsage and scale broom.

Distribution
Lepidospartum squamatum is native to the mountains, valleys, and deserts of central and southern California, and Baja California. It grows in sandy, gravelly soils in a number of habitat types, especially dry alluvial habitat such as arroyos. It is considered an indicator species for the alluvial scrub habitat type in this region. It is also commonly found in neighboring Arizona.

Description
Lepidospartum squamatum is a large shrub often exceeding two meters in height which takes a spreading, rounded form, its branches are coated in woolly fibers and stubby leaves no more than 3 millimeters long.  These drought adaptations support flowering during hot summers when many plants are dormant, making it an important resource for pollinators.

The inflorescence is a single flower head or small cluster of up to 5 heads at the ends of branches. The heads are discoid, bearing many yellow tubular disc florets and no ray florets. The fruit is a narrow achene a few millimeters long with a dull white to light brown pappus on top.  While in bloom, scale broom will attract a wide variety of pollinators, including bees, butterflies, moths, and tarantula hawk wasps.

As the fruits mature and the flower parts fall away the inflorescence takes on a cottony look due to all the pappi.

References

External links

Jepson Manual Treatment — Lepidospartum squamatum
Flora of North America
Lepidospartum squamatum — Photo gallery

Senecioneae
Flora of California
Flora of Baja California
Flora of Arizona
Flora of the Sierra Nevada (United States)
Flora of the California desert regions
Flora without expected TNC conservation status